The Whitehouse Open was a late Victorian era combined men's and women's tennis tournament played on both clay courts and grass courts organised by the Whitehouse Lawn Tennis Club, Edinburgh, Midlothian, Scotland. It was staged from 1884 to 1895.

History
In May 1884 the Whitehouse Open Lawn Tennis Tournament staged for the first time at the Whitehouse Lawn Tennis Club, Edinburgh, Lothian, Scotland. The tournament was played on both clay courts and grass courts, and ran until 1899. The Whitehouse Tennis Club (as it's now called) was founded in 1881 was still operating in 2000.

Finals

Mens Singles

Womens Singles
Incomplete Roll

See also
Tennis in Scotland

References

Clay court tennis tournaments
Defunct tennis tournaments in the United Kingdom
Grass court tennis tournaments